Walter Otto Hugo Karl Amtrup (15 March 1904 – 7 August 1974)  was a German actor, film dubber, opera singer (bass), and acting teacher.

Early life and education
Walter Amtrup was born in Altona, Hamburg as the son of a state court judge. He was student of the gymnasium in Lüneburg and, after achieving his Abitur, visited the Berlin University of the Arts from 1925 until 1931, where he was educated as an opera singer and a stage actor.

Opera and acting career
Amtrup made his professional opera debut in 1932 at the Landestheater Altenburg. This was followed by many appearances in Meißen, Neisse, Wilhelmshaven, Hanau, Bunzlau, at the Staatstheater Schwerin (state theater of Mecklenburg) and until the end of the Second World War at the municipal Städtische Bühnen in Chemnitz.

German Democratic Republic
Ten years after the End of World War II the Amtrup family moved to Central Germany in 1955, where Amtrup was employed as a character actor by the Städtische Bühnen Erfurt. In 1966 he was booked by the Meiningen Court Theatre, where his artistic career ended 1969.

Family
Walter Amtrup was married to former opera singer Johanna Amtrup, née Kieling. The couple had three children: Karin (born 1936), Turid (born 1943), and Niels-Torsten (born 1951). The German marine biologist and dolphin research scientist Karsten Brensing is Walter Amtrup’s grandson.

Artistic career

Education and engagements
1925–1931: Education at the Berlin University of the Arts, specializing in drama/opera
1932–1933: Landestheater Altenburg
1933: Stadttheater Meißen
1934: Stadttheater Neiße
1935: Neues Schauspielhaus der Jadestädte, Wilhelmshaven
1936: Stadttheater Hanau
1937–1941: Staatstheater Schwerin
1941–1945: Städtische Bühnen Chemnitz
1947–1951: Städtische Bühnen Flensburg
1955–1966: Städtische Bühnen Erfurt 
1966–1969: Meininger Theater

Roles

Theater
Theater Altenburg 

 1931: UB 16 (Wireless Operator)
 1931: Die Wundertannen am Wurzel (Wassermann)
 1932: Manon Lescaut (innkeeper)

Theater Meißen
 1933: Jagd ihn – ein Mensch (Bless-Karle)

Theater Neiße
 1933: Schlageter (Schlageter)
 1933: Doktor und Apotheker (pharmacist Stößel)
 1933: UB 16 (Helmsman)
 1933: Der Mann mit den grauen Schläfen (Baron Jaro Milanovici)
 1934: Die große Chance 
 1934: Don Cesar (Specialised Minister of Intrigue)

Theater Wilhelmshaven
 1934: Alle gegen Einen – Einer gegen Alle (Wasa)
 1934: Christa, ich erwarte Dich (Hans Tettenborn)
 1934: Minna von Barnhelm (Major von Tellheim)
 1934: Des Meeres und der Liebe Wellen (Naukleros)
 1935: Das Frühstück zu Rudolstadt (Duke of Alba)
 1935: Anna Kronthaler (Gaenswürger)
 1935: Das Wunderwasser (Adam Schrott)
 1935: Don Carlos (Marquis Posa)

Theater Hanau 
 1935: Peer Gynt (Peer Gynt)
 1935: Am Himmel Europas 
 1936: Die Insel (Commercial Attaché Raaz)

Theater Bunzlau 
 1936: Vertrag am Karakat (Risa Khan)

Schweriner Theater
 ?: Der Thron zwischen Erdteilen (Borkdorf/Sollikow; dual role)
 1937: Prinz Friedrich von Homburg (Count of Hohenzollern)
 1938: De adlige Rosenblome (Earl Hinrich von der Bröderborg)
 1939: Der andere Feldherr

Theater Chemnitz
 1941: Liebeskomödie 
 1941: Maria Stuart (Melvil)
 1942: Der Leutnant Vary (auditeur)
 1942: Ein Windstoß (Chief Appellate Judge)
 1942: Die große Kurve (Dr. Timm)
 1942: Die Braut von Messina (Drege)
 1942: Donna Diana (Diana’s father Don Diego)
 1943: Not Gottes (Monk Severin)
 1943: Ihr Talisman (Tsing)
 1943: Die Medaille (farmer Merkl)
 1944: Die Piccolomini (Count of Terzky)
 1944: Onkel Bonaparte (Lawyer Montklupo)

Theater Flensburg
 1947: Ein Inspektor kommt (Inspector Goole)
 1947: Pinkepank (mayor)
 1948: Des Teufels General (Chief Inspector Oderbruch)
 1948: Nathan der Weise (Nathan)
 1948: Egmont (grocer Soest)
 1948: Der Freischütz (Samiel, the black hunter)
 1948: Die erste Frau Selby (Philip Logan)
 1948: Wie es euch gefällt (Charles, a wrestler)
 1948: Romeo und Julia (Lord Capulet)
 1948: Der fröhliche Weinberg (Mr. Rindsfuß)
 1948: Draußen vor der Tür (Colonel)
 1948: Der Geizige (magistrate)
 1948: Der gestiefelte Kater (wizard Hudriwudri)
 1948: Der Kreidekreis (drudge)
 1948: Dreigroschenoper (Police Chief Brown)
 1948: Nebel (Lieutenant Schubert, detective)
 1948: Lady Windermeres Fächer (butler Parker)
 1948: Jeppe vom Berge (Jakob Schuster)
 1948: Hamlet (Claudius – King of Denmark, Hamlet’s uncle)
 1948: Aschenbrödel (Lord Stewart Grasemück)
 1948: Wenn der Schnee schmilzt (Wlad)
 1949: Der Lügner und die Nonne (butler Petrops)
 1949: Weiße Fracht (missionary)
 1949: Der Patriot (Aide-de-camp Murawiew)
 1949: Die kluge Verliebte (Cavalry Captain Bernardo)
 1949: Don Karlos (Duke of Medina Sidonia, Admiral)
 1949: Ein Spiel von Tod und Liebe (Jérom Courvoisier)
 1950: Die Wildente (Mr. Flor)
 1950: Der Tausch (Thomas Pollok Nagevire, broker)
 1950: Robert Guiskard (old man)
 1950: Einmann (chairman) [premiere]
 1950: Hund im Hirn (professor)
 1950: Jedermann (a poor neighbour)
 1951: Wilhelm Tell (Werner Freiherr von Attinghausen)
 1951: Und Pippa tanzt (stained-glass artist Scheidler)
 1951: Das tapfere Schneiderlein (warlock)
 1951: Ein Sommernachtstraum (Egeus)
 ?: Saison in Salzburg (Christian Dahlmann)
 ?: Menschen in Weiß (Dr. Clayton)
 ?: Im weißen Rößl (Franz Joseph, emperor of Austria-Hungary)
 ?: Ihr 106. Geburtstag (Monsignore Mouret, bishop)
 ?: Ballade am Strom (Büchler, boatman)
 ?: Pygmalion (Colonel Pickering)
 ?: Die Nachtigall (Grand Vizier)
 ?: Barbara Blomberg (Duke of Alba)
 ?: Die schmutzigen Hände (Karsky)
 ?: Frau im Hermelin (Stojahn)

Städtische Bühnen Erfurt
 1955: Wallenstein (Wallenstein)
 1956: Hamlet (ghost of Hamlet’s father)
 1956: Die Lützower 
 1956: Aufruhr in Buchara (Sultan)
 1956: Maria Stuart (Earl of Shrewsbury)
 1957: Der Widerspenstigen Zähmung (Vincentio)
 1957: König Lear (Earl of Gloster)
 1957: Der kaukasische Kreidekreis (gouverneur)
 ?: Ende gut, alles gut (Lafeu, an old nobleman)
 1958: Das Tagebuch der Anne Frank (Otto Frank)
 1958: Schweyk im Zweiten Weltkrieg (Hitler) 
 1958: Götz von Berlichingen (Emperor Maximilian)
 1958: Die Brücke 
 1958: Das Märchen (Mr. Charly) 
 1958: Kaution (Dr. Fuller)
 1958: Die Schatzinsel (father)
 1958: Auf jeden Fall verdächtig (englishman)
 1959: Kredit bei Nibelungen (General Fabiani)
 1959: Was ihr wollt (Orsino)
 1959: Die Niederlage (banker de Bleusse)
 1959: 15 Schnüre Geld 
 1959: Julius Caesar (Caesar)
 1959: Der Revisor (superintendent of schools Chlopow)
 1959: Wilhelm Tell (Attinghaus)
 1959: Winterschlacht (Lieutenant-Colonel v. Quabbe)
 1960: Antigone (Theresias) [at the Erfurter Domstufen]
 1960: Die Weber (the old Hilse)
 1961: Das Leben des Galilei (Sagredo)
 1961: Richard III. (Lord Hastings)
 1961: Irkutsker Geschichten 
 1961: Die Jungfrau von Orleans (La Hire, Royal Officer) [at the Erfurter Domstufen]
 1961: Die Stärkeren (Engineer)
 1961: Optimistische Tragödie (1. presbyter)
 1961: Eine kleine Traumfabrik 
 1961: Und das am Heiligabend (the other father)
 1962: Vor Sonnenuntergang (Privy Counsellor Matthias Clausen)
 1962: Urfaust [auf den Domstufen]
 1962: Ein idealer Gatte (Earl of Caversham)
 1962: Die Holländerbraut 
 1963: Der Heiratsschwindler (Andersch)
 1963: Egmont (Duke of Alba) [at the Erfurter Domstufen]
 1963: Parkstraße 13 (Dr. Elken)
 1963: Das 11. Gebot (confectioner)
 1963: Macbeth (Duncan)
 1964: Krieg und Frieden (doctor)
 1964: Romeo und Julia (Brother Lorenzo) [at the Erfurter Domstufen]
 1964: Das Untier von Samarkant (indian merchant Shalakandavra)
 1964: Prof. Hudebrauch (Guttler)
 1964: Peter und der Wolf (narrator)
 1964: Die Räuber (Count of Moor)
 1965: Mutter Courage und ihre Kinder (soldier)
 1965: Unterwegs (father)
 1965: Komödie der Irrungen (Aegon)
 1965: Die Geier der Helen Turner (Captain Brixon)
 1965: Nathan der Weise (Nathan)
 1966: Der Besuch der alten Dame (butler)

Meininger Theater (excerpts) 
 Das Feuerwerk  (Albert Oberholzer) 
 Der Besuch der alten Dame (butler) 
 Herodes und Mariamne (Sameas, a pharisee) 
 Unterwegs (train conductor) 
 Die Räuber (Daniel, housekeeper) 
 Maria Stuart (Melvil, house steward) 
 Caesar und Cleopatra (3. senior official / majordomo) 
 Amphitryon (Argatiphontidas)

Film and Television
Actor 
 1957: Polonia-Express  
 1959: Der Spekulant (TV) 
 1960: Die Hunde bellen nicht mehr (TV) 
Film dubber
 1958: Kassendiebe – as Bocek (Czechoslovakian Film)
 1958: Testpiloten – as Anufrijew (Mosfilm)
 1959: Die Erfindung des Verderbens – as Graf Artigas (Czechoslovakian Film)
 1959: Die letzte Chance (Italian Film)
 1960: Tierfänger – as animal catcher – not mentioned by name (Soviet Film)
 1961: Das schwarze Gesicht – not mentioned by name (Hungarian Film)

References

External links
 Walter Amtrup: Ringparabel (Nathan der Weise; Lessing)

1904 births
1974 deaths
People from Altona, Hamburg
Musicians from Hamburg
Male actors from Hamburg
German male film actors
German male stage actors
20th-century German male actors
German operatic basses
20th-century German male opera singers
Berlin University of the Arts alumni